The Dean Metalman ML is a bass guitar made by Dean Guitars in the shape of the Dean ML.

There are two versions of this bass, both produced exclusively in a glossy black finish. The first has one humbucking pickup in the bridge position, 1 volume control, and a tone control. The second, the Metalman ML 2A, has red buzzsaw inlays, two humbucking pickups, a bridge and a neck, two volume controls, and a 2 band active EQ with controls for high and low frequencies.

See also
Dean Metalman Z

References

Dean bass guitars